Doktor Kosmos is a Swedish pop band best characterized by the unique style of their humorous lyrics. The lyrics often have social or political themes, and the band is socialist, although not above making fun of their own opinions.

One of the gimmicks of the band is recurring characters in their songs. One of these is "Doktor Kosmos" himself ("Doktor Kosmos" simply means "Doctor Cosmos" in Swedish). Doktor Kosmos is at the same time the stage name for the band's front man Uje Brandelius.

History

Doktor Kosmos was founded in 1991 in Uppsala. The original line-up was Uje Brandelius (synth, vocals), Martin Aagård (guitar), Lina Selleby (vocals) and Catti Larson (vocals). Soon afterwards, Henrik Högberg joined the band on drums.

In 1995, the band released their first album, Socialmedicin. It was followed by Stjärnjerry in 1996. Stjärnjerry is a rock opera that tells the story of a young man, "Stjärnjerry", who gets into trouble. He owes his drug dealer money and when he can't pay, he buys a gun and shoots the dealer. The story continues in "Evas Story", in which we follow Jerry's Girlfriend, Mördarbruden Eva (The Killer Chick Eva).

Members 
 Uje Brandelius (1971), synthesizer, vocals
 Catti Brandelius (1971)
 Lina Selleby (1971), synthesizer, vocals
 Anders Bennysson (1973), guitar, synthesizer
 Martin Aagård (1971), guitar, bass guitar, synthesizer 
 Henrik Svensson (1975), drums

Discography

Albums
1995: Socialmedicin
1996: Cocktail
1996: Stjärn Jerry - en rockopera
1997: Single of the Week (Together with 'Friend')
2000: Evas Story
2002: Reportage!
2005: Ett enkelt svar
2008: Hallå?
2019: Hej Alla Barn

Tapes
1994: Doktor Kosmos och Starlightorkestern
1998: Rymderevolution!
1998: For Freaks Only

Singles
1999: Le Punkrocker
2001: Jag låg med henne i Tjeckoslovakien
2001: Känslorna
2001: Jimi Tenor och Kennet Johnsson
2005: När min pojke går på stan
2006: Assburner (ep)

External links
Official website

Swedish musical groups